The Regional Council of Liguria (Consiglio Regionale della Liguria) is the legislative assembly of Liguria.

It was first elected in 1970, when the ordinary regions were instituted, on the basis of the Constitution of Italy of 1948.

Composition
The Regional Council of Liguria was originally composed of 50 regional councillors. Following the decree-law n. 138 of 13 August 2011 the number of regional councillors was reduced to 30, with an additional seat reserved for the President of the Region.

Political groups
The Regional Council of Liguria is currently composed of the following political groups:

See also
Regional council
Politics of Liguria
President of Liguria

References

External links
Regional Council of Liguria

Politics of Liguria
Italian Regional Councils
Liguria